Italo may refer to:

Italo-, a prefix indicating a relation to Italy or Italians

Film
Italo (film), a 2014 comedy film
Italo crime, a genre of crime film

Music genres
Italo disco
Italo dance
Italo house

People
Italo Allodi (1928–1999), footballer
Ítalo Argentino Lúder (1916–2008), Argentine politician
Italo Balbo (1896–1940), politician
Italo Bocchino (born 1957), politician
Italo Brancucci (1904–1958), composer
Italo "Babe" Caccia (1917–2009), American college athlete, coach, and administrator
Italo Calvino (1923–1985), writer
Italo Campanini (1845–1896), singer
Italo Casini (1892–?), bobsledder
Italo Chelini (1914–1972), baseball player
Italo Cappabianca (1936–2001), politician
Ítalo Estupiñán (1952–2016), footballer
Ítalo Ferreira (born 1994), Brazilian surfer
Italo Galbiati (born 1937), footballer
Italo Gardoni (1821–1882), singer
Italo Gariboldi (1879–1970), soldier
Italo Gismondi (1887–1974), archæologist
Italo Mattioli (born 1985), footballer
Italo Montemezzi (1875–1952), composer
Italo Moscati (born 1937), writer
Italo Mus (1892–1967), painter
Ítalo Perea (born 1993), boxer
Italo Petrelli, bobsledder
Ítalo Piaggi (1936–2012), soldier
Italo Righi (born 1959), politician
Italo Santelli (1866–1945), fencer
Italo Sarrocco (1898–2007), soldier
Italo Scanga (1932–2001), artist
Italo Svevo (1861–1928), writer
Italo Tajo (1915–1993), singer
Italo Vassalo (born 1940), footballer
Italo Viglianesi (1916–1995), politician
Italo Zanzi (born 1974)
Italo Zilioli (born 1941), cyclist
Italo Zingarelli (1930–2000), film producer
Italo Zucchelli (born 1965), fashion designer

Other uses
A rail service offered by Nuovo Trasporto Viaggiatori
Triavio Italo, an Italian aircraft design